Mengjia may refer to:

Mengjia Town, a town in Faku County, Liaoning, China
Mengjia Township, a township in Hulan District, Harbin, Heilongjiang, China
Wanhua District, a district in Taipei, Taiwan, originally called Mengjia (alternatively spelled Monga, Mengxia, Mongka, etc.)
Bangka Park, a park in Wanhua District
Monga (film), a period film set and filmed in Wanhua District

See also
Meng Jia (born 1990), Chinese entertainer and former member of the girl group Miss A
Mengxia (disambiguation)
Monga (disambiguation)